Nogales High School is a public high school located in La Puente, California. It is a part of the Rowland Unified School District.

Nogales Nobles
 Cecil Fielder – MLB player 
 Alvin Youngblood Hart - guitarist, singer, songwriter
 Roger Hernandez – California State Assemblyman
 Tom House – Major League Baseball (MLB) pitcher
 Darryll Lewis – National Football League (NFL) cornerback
 Regina Zernay Roberts – musician
 Kevin Devine - NFL
 TJ Campbell - NBA
 Joshua Moreno - NBA

References

External links

High schools in Los Angeles County, California
International Baccalaureate schools in California
Public high schools in California
La Puente, California
Valle Vista League
1961 establishments in California